Parathion methyl, or methyl parathion, is an organophosphate insecticide, possessing an organothiophosphate group. It is structurally very similar to parathion-ethyl. It is not allowed for sale and import in nearly all countries around the world, while a few allow it under subject to specified conditions only.

Applications 
Parathion methyl is used as an insecticide on crops, including cotton.

Trade Names 
Penncap-M, Metacide

Safety 
People can be exposed to parathion methyl in the workplace by breathing it in, getting it on their skin, swallowing it, or getting it in their eyes. Since it is an acetylcholinesterase inhibitor, symptoms of exposure to parathion methyl include irritated eyes and skin, nausea and vomiting, abdominal pain, diarrhea, salivation, feeling weak and tired, headache, runny nose, tightness in the chest, blurry vision, pupil constriction, irregular heartbeat, muscle twitches (fasciculation), and difficulty breathing.

In the United States, the Occupational Safety and Health Administration (OSHA) has not set a legal limit (permissible exposure limit) for parathion methyl exposure in the workplace. The National Institute for Occupational Safety and Health (NIOSH) has set a recommended exposure limit (REL) of 0.2 mg/m3 over an 8-hour workday.

Classifications and restrictions 
Parathion methyl has been restricted for many years. It is classified as Extremely Hazardous (Ia) by the World Health Organization and it is classified as Severely Hazardous by the Rotterdam Convention. It is not allowed for sale and import in nearly all countries around the world, while a few allow it under subject to specified conditions only.

References 

Acetylcholinesterase inhibitors
Organophosphate insecticides
Methyl esters
Organothiophosphate esters